Biggs is an unincorporated community in Mason County, Illinois, United States.

The community is named for Paul G. Biggs, who owned a local grain elevator in the 1870s.  A post office was established in 1875.

References

Unincorporated communities in Mason County, Illinois
Unincorporated communities in Illinois